They Live is a 1988 American science-fiction action thriller film.

They Live may also refer to:
 They Live (Calico System album), 2005
 They Live (Evil Nine album), 2008
 They Live (Weak13 album), 2015
 They Live (soundtrack), a soundtrack for the film